Hog Island (literally "tea broth place") is a  long barrier island located off the northwest coast of Prince Edward Island in Canada. The island is notable for its unique sandhill ecosystem and cultural significance to the Mi'kmaq people.

Geography
Hog Island is the largest and southernmost island of a series of barrier islands that separate Malpeque Bay to the southwest from the larger Gulf of Saint Lawrence, to the northeast. It borders Lennox and Bird Islands to the west, and the Conway Sandhills to the northwest.

Wildlife
The Hog Island Sandhills are home to many endangered species including the piping plover, the gypsy's cuckoo bumbleebee, the northern long-eared bat and the little brown bat.

Preservation
The island is included within the tentative boundaries of Pitaweikek National Park Reserve, a national park reserve first proposed by the Mi'kmaq First Nations in 2005. In 2019, Parks Canada began a  feasibility assessment on the establishment of a national park reserve.

See also
Cascumpec Bay
Lennox Island

References

Barrier islands
Islands of Prince Edward Island